General Poole Vallancey England (1787–1884) was Master Gunner, St James's Park, the most senior Ceremonial Post in the Royal Artillery after the Sovereign.

Military career
England was commissioned into the Royal Artillery in 1805. He served with the British Army Garrison in Malta from 1824 to 1826 and rose through the officer ranks to become a Lieutenant-General in 1866.

He was made Colonel Commandant of the Royal Artillery in 1866. He was promoted to full General in 1873 and retired in 1877, and then held the position of Master Gunner, St James's Park from 1880.

England died at his home at 41 Marine Parade in Dover on 21 November 1884.

Family
He married Mary Lutwyche and together they went on to have a son and two daughters.

References

1787 births
1884 deaths
British Army generals
Royal Artillery officers
Military personnel from New Jersey